Gérard Saint (Renouard, 11 July 1935 — Le Mans, 16 March 1960) was a French professional road bicycle racer. In the 1959 Tour de France, Saint was the winner of the Combativity award. In 1960, while driving his Citroen DS near Le Mans, Saint hit a tree and died at the scene.

Major results

1957
Tour de Luxembourg
Tour de l'Ariège
1958
Boucles de l'Aulne
Egletons
Meymac
Taule
1959
Bol d'Or des Monédières Chaumeil
Felletin
GP d'Alger (with Raphaël Géminiani and Roger Rivière)
Nice
Saint-Jean d'Angely
Chateau-Chinon
Manche-Océan
Tour de France:
9th place overall classification
 Winner Combativity award

External links 

Official Tour de France results for Gérard Saint

French male cyclists
1935 births
1960 deaths
Sportspeople from Orne
Cyclists from Normandy